Kefalari (before 1926: Σέτομα - Setoma) is a village in Kastoria Regional Unit, Macedonia, Greece.

The Greek census (1920) recorded 408 people in the village and in 1923 there were 164 inhabitants (or 30 families) who were Muslim. Following the Greek-Turkish population exchange, in 1926 within Setoma there were 16 refugee families from Asia Minor and 9 refugee families from Pontus. The Greek census (1928) recorded 371 village inhabitants. There were 25 refugee families (104 people) in 1928.

References

Populated places in Kastoria (regional unit)